Colleville is a commune in the Seine-Maritime department in the Normandy region in northern France.

Geography

Population

Places of interest
 The church of St.Martin, dating from the nineteenth century.
 Some prehistoric and Gallo-Roman remains.
 The sixteenth century château d'Hongerville.

Notable people
 Anthony Coucke (born 1978) famous author documentalist, famous for his many biographies about music bands such as Scooter. He also contributed to Techno Hardcore rising in the world with his project called Citron8.

See also
Communes of the Seine-Maritime department

References

Communes of Seine-Maritime